Glenlogan is a rural locality in the City of Logan, Queensland, Australia. It is part of the suburban development corridor south of Brisbane in the Greater Flagstone development area.

History
Glenlogan is situated in the Bundjalung traditional Indigenous Australian country. 

The locality takes its name from the former Glenlogan Park thoroughbred stud farm on Lance Road. Glenlogan was designated a locality within the Logan City by the Department of Natural Resources and Mines in September 2017. It was excised from land formerly in Jimboomba.

Geography
The Logan River forms the western and north-western boundaries. The Sydney–Brisbane rail corridor follows the south-eastern boundary.

Road infrastructure
Mount Lindesay Highway passes to the east.

Education 
There are no schools in Glenlogan. The nearest primary schools are in neighbouring Jimboomba, Flagstone and Woodhill. The nearest secondary school is in Flagstone.

References

Suburbs of Logan City
Localities in Queensland